Clay County is a county located in the U.S. state of Texas. As of the 2020 census, its population was 10,218. The county seat is Henrietta. The county was founded in 1857 and later organized in 1860. It is named in honor of Henry Clay, famous American statesman, Kentucky Senator and United States Secretary of State.

Clay County is part of the Wichita Falls, Metropolitan Statistical Area in North Texas.

The Wichita Falls rancher, oilman, and philanthropist Joseph Sterling Bridwell owned a ranch in Clay County, among his multiple holdings.

Geography

Lake Arrowhead State Park, a  development on Lake Arrowhead in Clay County, encompasses  acres. The lakeshore extends 106 miles; the park offers bicycling, birding, boating, camping, canoeing, fishing, hiking, horseback riding, nature study, picnicking, swimming, and wildlife observation.

Adjacent counties
 Jefferson County, Oklahoma (north)
 Montague County (east)
 Jack County (south)
 Archer County (west)
 Wichita County (northwest)
 Cotton County, Oklahoma (northwest)

Demographics

Note: the US Census treats Hispanic/Latino as an ethnic category. This table excludes Latinos from the racial categories and assigns them to a separate category. Hispanics/Latinos can be of any race.

As of the census of 2000, there were 11,006 people, 4,323 households, and 3,181 families residing in the county.  The population density was 10 people per square mile (4/km2).  There were 4,992 housing units at an average density of 4 per square mile (2/km2).  The racial makeup of the county was 95.35% White, 0.42% Black or African American, 1.03% Native American, 0.10% Asian, 0.01% Pacific Islander, 1.68% from other races, and 1.42% from two or more races.  3.67% of the population were Hispanic or Latino of any race. At 89.4% of the county's population, Clay County has the highest percentage of Non-Hispanic Whites in the state of Texas. 

There were 4,323 households, out of which 30.70% had children under the age of 18 living with them, 63.20% were married couples living together, 7.30% had a female householder with no husband present, and 26.40% were non-families. 23.50% of all households were made up of individuals, and 11.80% had someone living alone who was 65 years of age or older.  The average household size was 2.52 and the average family size was 2.98.

In the county, the population was spread out, with 24.90% under the age of 18, 6.80% from 18 to 24, 26.40% from 25 to 44, 25.90% from 45 to 64, and 16.10% who were 65 years of age or older.  The median age was 40 years. For every 100 females, there were 94.00 males.  For every 100 females age 18 and over, there were 93.10 males.

The median income for a household in the county was $35,738, and the median income for a family was $41,514. Males had a median income of $28,914 versus $20,975 for females. The per capita income for the county was $16,361.  About 8.10% of families and 10.30% of the population were below the poverty line, including 11.70% of those under age 18 and 11.00% of those age 65 or over.

Transportation

Major highways
  U.S. Highway 82
  U.S. Highway 287
  State Highway 79
  State Highway 148

Farm to Market Roads

Communities

Cities
 Bellevue
 Byers
 Dean
 Henrietta (county seat)
 Jolly
 Petrolia

Town
 Windthorst (mostly in Archer County)

Unincorporated communities

 Bluegrove
 Buffalo Springs
 Charlie
 Halsell
 Hurnville
 Joy
 Shannon
 Stanfield
 Thornberry
 Vashti

Politics
Clay County is represented in the Texas House of Representatives by Republican James Frank, a businessman from Wichita Falls.

Prior to 1996, Clay County was strongly Democratic in presidential elections. The only Republican Party candidates who managed to win the county from 1912 to 1992 were Herbert Hoover thanks to anti-Catholic sentiment towards Al Smith as well as Richard Nixon & Ronald Reagan in their 49-state landslides of 1972 & 1984, respectively. Since 1996, the county has swung hard to the supporting Republican Party similar to almost all white-majority rural counties in the Solid South.

Education
School districts serving sections of the county include:
 Bellevue Independent School District
 Bowie Independent School District
 Burkburnett Independent School District
 Gold-Burg Independent School District
 Henrietta Independent School District
 Midway Independent School District
 Petrolia Consolidated Independent School District
 Windthorst Independent School District

The county is in the service area of Vernon College.

See also

 List of museums in North Texas
 National Register of Historic Places listings in Clay County, Texas
 Recorded Texas Historic Landmarks in Clay County

References

External links

 Clay County Official Website
 See historic photos of Clay County from the Clay County Historical Society, hosted by the Portal to Texas History
 
 Clay County 1890 Jail Museum-Heritage Center

 
1860 establishments in Texas
Wichita Falls metropolitan area
Populated places established in 1860